Ruta Gedmintas is a British actress known for her work on television, primarily in The Strain, Spooks: Code 9, The Borgias, The Tudors, Lip Service and His Dark Materials.

Early life
Gedmintas was born in Canterbury, Kent, the daughter of a Lithuanian father and an English mother. She grew up in Buckinghamshire and trained at the Drama Centre London under Reuven Adiv.

Career
Gedmintas appeared in Spooks: Code 9 as Rachel Harris, a former police officer. She has also had guest roles in the BBC's Waking the Dead and ITV1's The Bill. She also appeared as Elizabeth Blount in Showtime's The Tudors. In 2010 she worked on the independent films Zerosome and Atletu (aka The Athlete); and then starred as Frankie in BBC Three's Lip Service.

Gedmintas appeared in the American drama Do No Harm as Olivia Flynn. The series aired for one season from January through September 2013 before being cancelled. She starred in an episode of the critically acclaimed show Ripper Street. She also starred in The Strain as Dutch, a computer hacker. In 2019 she was cast as Serafina Pekkala in His Dark Materials.

Gedmintas starred in Unfaithful at London's Found111, alongside Sean Campion (The Borgias, Stones in his Pockets), Niamh Cusack (Heartbeat, The Curious Incident of the Dog in the Night-time) and Matthew Lewis (Harry Potter film series, The Syndicate). Gedmintas was interviewed (August 2016) regarding her previous roles as Astrid in Backbeat, Sophie in Stag, Betty (an animal-loving neighbour) in A Street Cat Named Bob, released in November 2016.

Filmography

References

External links
 
 Gedmintas on Twitter
 Bio at United Agents
 Ruta Gedmintas – Profile Model Management
 London theatre interview with Ruta Gedmintas
 Ruta Gedmintas – Celebrity supporter – Alzheimer's Society

Actresses from Kent
Alumni of the Drama Centre London
English people of Lithuanian descent
English stage actresses
English television actresses
Living people
People from Canterbury
Year of birth missing (living people)